Ammobium is genus of perennial Asteraceae species described as a genus in 1824 by Robert Brown, with the type species being Ammobium alatum.

Ammobium is native to eastern Australia.

Species
Ammobium alatum R.Br. - New South Wales, Queensland, Victoria, Tasmania, South Australia
Ammobium craspedioides Benth. - New South Wales

References

Gnaphalieae
Asterales of Australia
Asteraceae genera
Flora of New South Wales
Flora of Queensland
Flora of Tasmania
Flora of South Australia
Flora of Victoria (Australia)